The 2000–01 season was the 57th season in the existence of Lille OSC and the club's first season back in the top flight of French football. They participated in the Ligue 1, the Coupe de France and the Coupe de la Ligue.

Players

First-team squad

Transfers

In

Out

Competitions

Overall record

Division 1

League table

Results summary

Results by round

Matches

Coupe de France

Coupe de la Ligue

References 

Lille OSC seasons
Lille